The I.W.P. Buchanan House is a historic house in Lebanon, Tennessee, U.S.. It was built circa 1894 for Isaac William Pleasant Buchanan, whose father, Dr. Andrew H. Buchanan, was the chair of the Department of Mathematics at Cumberland University. Buchanan himself taught Mathematics at Lincoln College in Illinois and co-founded the Castle Heights Military Academy in Lebanon, where he also taught Mathematics. The house was designed by architect George Franklin Barber in the Queen Anne style. It has been listed on the National Register of Historic Places since January 8, 1979.

References

Houses on the National Register of Historic Places in Tennessee
Queen Anne architecture in Tennessee
Houses completed in 1894
Houses in Wilson County, Tennessee